Wiedźmin is a 2001 album with music of Grzegorz Ciechowski for the film The Hexer, directed by Marek Brodzki, which was an adaptation of the collection of short stories by Andrzej Sapkowski of the same title.  The album contains 22 compositions. In 2002, Ciechowski received (posthumously) the Polish Film Awards for the album in the "Best Score" category.

The album has been certified "gold" by the Polish Society of the Phonographic Industry.

Artists involved
 Grzegorz Ciechowski
 Zbigniew Krzywański
 Alicja Węgorzewska-Whiskerd
 Michael Jones
 Zbigniew Zamachowski
 Robert Gawliński
 Sławomir Ciesielski
 Choir Kairos

Song list
 Wiedźmin
 Pocałunek Yennefer
 Zew wilka
 Pierwsza rada Jaskra
 Onirina
 Lawina
 Sen Yen
 Druga rada Jaskra
 Odnajdę cię, Ciri
 Uciekajcie!
 Trzecia rada Jaskra
 Koniec z bandą Renfri
 Jak gwiazdy nad traktem
 Śmierć Renfri
 Bajka dla małej driady
 Lecenie ran
 Karczma w Blaviken
 Zapachniało jesienią
 Ballada dla Yen
 Czwarta rada Jaskra
 Ratuj, Wiedźminie
 Nie Pokonasz Miłości

References

The Witcher
2001 soundtrack albums
2001 in Polish music